Kasma (also Romanized as Kasmā and Kasmā’) is a village in Kasma Rural District, in the Central District of Sowme'eh Sara County, Gilan Province, Iran. At the 2006 census, its population was 1,785, in 499 families.

References 

Populated places in Sowme'eh Sara County